Barbara A. Humphreys (alternate, Humphrys; born in Saskatchewan) is a Canadian architect and author, specializing in public service, historic preservation, and housing.

Life
Humphreys graduated from the University of Manitoba with a degree in architecture (1941). She worked for the Defence Industries Limited Architectural Division (Montreal), and the Plant Engineering Division of Victory Aircraft Limited (Malton. She was in private practice from 1954. In 1969, she directed a survey of Rideau Canal corridor's architectural heritage. This was a pilot project for the Canadian Inventory of Historic Buildings, and Humphreys was both its founder and chief. Humphreys retired in 1981.

Selected works
1970, "Didsbury", Cannington Manor, Saskatchewan
1972, The Allen House, Yarmouth, N.S.
1972, Pichet House -127 rue Royal Ste. Famille, Ile d'Orleans (with Meredith H Sykes)
1974, Canadian historic sites : occasional papers in archaeology and history, no. 10 (with Jane E Harris; Edward F Bush; Parks Canada. National Historic Parks and Sites Branch)
1974, The architectural heritage of the Rideau Corridor (with Jane E Harris; Edward F Bush)
1979, Eversley Farm, R.R. No. 3, King City, Ontario
1980, The buildings of Canada : a guide to pre-20th-century styles in houses, churches and other structures (with Meredith H Sykes; Michael Middleton; Parks Canada)

Awards
1992, Gabrielle Léger Medal (awarded  to volunteers or professionals who have made an outstanding contribution to the conservation of heritage in Canada over a period of twenty years or more)

Bibliography

References

2017 deaths
Canadian women architects
University of Manitoba alumni
Canadian women non-fiction writers
Canadian non-fiction writers
Year of birth missing
20th-century Canadian architects
21st-century Canadian architects
20th-century Canadian women writers